Badminton was contested at the 1998 Asian Games in Thammasat Gymnasium 2, Bangkok, Thailand from December 8 to December 17.

Singles, doubles, and team events were contested for both men and women. Mixed doubles were also contested.

Medalists

Medal table

Participating nations
A total of 132 athletes from 14 nations competed in badminton at the 1998 Asian Games:

References
 Results

External links
Badminton Asia

 
Badminton
Asian Games
Multi-sport events, Asian Games
Multi-sport events, Asian Games
1998